Hollis is a city in and the county seat of Harmon County, Oklahoma, United States.  The population was 2,060 at the 2010 census.

History
The city was named for George W. Hollis, a local businessman and member of the townsite committee that laid out the town in 1898, while the site was still in old Greer County, Texas.  The original plat was lost, and after a lawsuit, the town was re-platted in 1903. The original business district comprised a general store opened by George Hollis and a blacksmith shop owned by  James (Jim) Maylen Prock. A post office named for Hollis was established October 31, 1901.

Hollis was in Greer County, Oklahoma until 1909, when Governor Haskell divided the old county into Greer County  and Harmon County, Hollis fell into Harmon County. An election was held to choose a county seat. Contenders were Hollis, Dryden, Looney and Vinson.  Hollis won the election.

Geography
Hollis is located at  (34.686374, -99.916889).

Climate
Hollis experiences a humid subtropical climate (Köppen Cfa) with cool, dry winters and hot wetter summers.  The more detailed Trewartha climate classification identifies the climate as humid subtropical with very hot summers and cool winters (Crhk).

Demographics

As of the census of 2000, there were 2,264 people, 845 households, and 561 families residing in the city. The population density was 1,589.8 people per square mile (615.6/km2). There were 1,081 housing units at an average density of 759.1/sq mi (293.9/km2). The racial makeup of the city was 66.65% White, 12.68% African American, 0.84% Native American, 0.22% Asian, 17.67% from other races, and 1.94% from two or more races. 28.18% of the population were Hispanic or Latino of any race.

There were 845 households, out of which 31.6% had children under the age of 18 living with them, 51.5% were married couples living together, 11.4% had a female householder with no husband present, and 33.6% were non-families. 30.4% of all households were made up of individuals, and 18.8% had someone living alone who was 65 years of age or older. The average household size was 2.50 and the average family size was 3.10.

In the city, the population was spread out, with 27.3% under the age of 18, 7.8% from 18 to 24, 24.1% from 25 to 44, 19.9% from 45 to 64, and 20.9% who were 65 years of age or older. The median age was 39 years. For every 100 females, there were 90.3 males. For every 100 females age 18 and over, there were 86.2 males.

The median income for a household in the city was $19,421, and the median income for a family was $23,103. Males had a median income of $20,791 versus $14,792 for females. The per capita income for the city was $10,408. About 29.4% of families and 36.2% of the population were below the poverty line, including 47.6% of those under age 18 and 26.2% of those age 65 or over.

Additional information
Hollis is a close-knit community which only has one stoplight at the corner of Highway 62 and Highway 30, the only two main highways that pass through the town.  It features the Hollis Municipal Airport located north of the town on Highway 30 and the Hollis Livestock Commission, which is a major source of economy for the town.

Education
The Hollis Public School System comprises the only school located in Harmon County, and its Sallie Gillentine Elementary School is Harmon County's sole elementary school.

Notable people

 Darrell Royal, Hollis is the birthplace of Texas Longhorns football head coach
 Ted Owens, University of Kansas former head basketball coach
 Wilcy Moore, MLB pitcher, 19–7 record with 1927 Yankees
 Von McDaniel, MLB pitcher
 Lindy McDaniel, MLB pitcher
 Alton Coppage, University of Oklahoma and professional football player
 Glen Hardin, musician
 Terry Stafford, singer  ("Amarillo by Morning" and "Suspicion").
 Leon Heath, All-American running back, University of Oklahoma and NFL
 Monte Moore, Sports Broadcaster, Voice of Oakland Athletics
 Leon Manley, football player for University of Oklahoma, Green Bay Packers, Edmonton Eskimos and offensive coordinator of Texas Longhorns

References

External links
 Encyclopedia of Oklahoma History and Culture - Hollis

Cities in Oklahoma
Cities in Harmon County, Oklahoma
County seats in Oklahoma